Wharton Independent School District is a public school district based in Wharton, Texas (USA).  Wharton ISD's motto is "Preparing Today for a Competitive Tomorrow."  Visit www.whartonisd.net for more information.

In 2014, the Wharton Independent School District was rated "Met Standard" by the Texas Education Agency.

Schools
Wharton High School (Grades 9–12)
Wharton Junior High School (Grades 6–8)
Wharton Elementary School (Grades 3–5)
Sivells Elementary School (Grades PK-2)

References 

TEA Texas Consolidated School Rating Report = http://ritter.tea.state.tx.us/perfreport/tcsr/2014/srch.html

External links
 

School districts in Wharton County, Texas